The Post Office (Revenues) Act 1710 (9 Ann c 11) was an Act of the Parliament of Great Britain, which established post offices in the colonies and allotted its weekly revenues for the ongoing war and other uses.

The Act repealed the 1695 Act of William III and united the Post Offices of England and Scotland under two  Postmasters General of Great Britain;

The Post Office (Revenues) Act 1710, except the last two sections, was repealed by section 1 of, and the Schedule to, the Statute Law Revision Act 1871.

So much of the Post Office (Revenues) Act 1710 as was unrepealed was repealed by section 92 of, and Schedule 2 to, the Post Office Act 1908.

Section 45
This section is section 91 in Ruffhead's Edition. This section was repealed by section 1 of, and the Schedule to, 37 & 38 Vict c 22.

This Act is chapter 10 in Ruffhead's Edition.

See also
Post Office Act

References

External links
 Text of the Act Great Britain Philatelic Society

Great Britain Acts of Parliament 1710
General Post Office